Mohamed El-Sayed (born 3 March 2003) is an Egyptian epee fencer. He competed in the 2020 Summer Olympics, losing in the quarter final to Ukrainian and eventual bronze medalist Igor Reizlin . He won the gold medal in the men's individual épée event at the 2022 Mediterranean Games held in Oran, Algeria.

References

2003 births
Living people
Sportspeople from Cairo
People from Tanta
Fencers at the 2020 Summer Olympics
Egyptian male épée fencers
Olympic fencers of Egypt
Fencers at the 2018 Summer Youth Olympics
World Cadets and Juniors Fencing Championships medalists
21st-century Egyptian people
Mediterranean Games gold medalists for Egypt
Competitors at the 2022 Mediterranean Games
Mediterranean Games medalists in fencing